Beware of Dog is an American sitcom that was aired on Animal Planet. While it had two episodes broadcast consecutively on August 13, 2002, this was the only time that the series made it to the air.

Synopsis
The program focuses on a bearded collie named Jack (played by Chip, voiced by Park Bench), whose Look Who's Talking-style narration provided his perspective of his newly adopted family. Carolyn Dunn and Richard Waugh portrayed Mary and Bill Poole, parents of Mark (Gage Knox) and Jessica (Alex Appel).

The pilot showed how Jack feigned an injury in a grocery store parking lot to entice Jessica into taking him to the family house. The family collectively decided to take care of him until the injury is healed, but Jack became a permanent resident after disrupting a family argument and saving Mark from a neighborhood gang.

The second - and last - episode to be aired had Jack being kicked out of the Poole home after ruining Bill's vacation plans; the rest of the episode was spent on the family's search for the dog after Bill had a change of heart.

Cast
Carolyn Dunn as Mary Poole
Richard Waugh as Bill Poole
Gage Knox as Mark Poole
Alex Appel as Jessica Poole
Park Bench as Jack (voice)

Episodes

Reception
The program received generally negative reviews from the national press. Animal Planet cancelled the series before the scheduled airing of the third episode. As of now, the remaining episodes remain unaired.

Production notes
Beware of Dog was directed by Richard Martin, who also served in that position for the motion pictures Matinee and Disney's Air Bud: Golden Receiver. Rob Gilmer was the screenwriter. The executive producers were Don Enright, Elizabeth Mozden, and Les Alexander.

References

External links 
 

2002 American television series debuts
2002 American television series endings
2000s American sitcoms
Animal Planet original programming
English-language television shows
Television shows about dogs